Billy Frank Jr. (March 9, 1931 – May 5, 2014) was a Native American environmental leader and treaty rights activist.  A Nisqually tribal member, Frank led a grassroots campaign for fishing rights on the tribe's Nisqually River, located in Washington state, in the 1960s and 1970s. As a lifelong activist and the chairman of the Northwest Indian Fisheries Commission for over thirty years, Frank promoted cooperative management of natural resources.

Frank advocated for tribal fishing rights during the Fish Wars by hosting a series of “fish-ins” where his actions culminated in the Boldt Decision, which affirmed that Washington state tribes were entitled to half of each year’s fish harvest.

Frank was posthumously awarded the Presidential Medal of Freedom by President Barack Obama in November 2015. The Nisqually National Wildlife Refuge was renamed in his honor in December 2015. Billy Frank Jr. continues to be considered to be an important bridge between Western and Native American societies in regards to environmental sustainability.

Early life 
Billy Frank Jr. was born in Nisqually, Washington in 1931 to Willie and Angeline Frank. His father Willie, born Qui-Lash-Kut, lived to 104 years and his mother Angeline lived into her 90's. He grew up on six acres on the Nisqually River known as Frank’s Landing, land purchased by his father "after the expansion of an Army base nearby drove them from their reservation."  His formal education ended after he finished the ninth grade in Olympia and went on to work in construction by day, and fishing at night.

In 1952, Frank joined the US Marine Corps at age 21 and served for two years.

Activism 

Frank was first arrested at age of 14 while fishing on the Nisqually River, following a run-in with game wardens in 1945. According to report, Frank had been fishing for salmon, and, while emptying his net, he was accosted by two wardens who allegedly shoved his face into the mud as he struggled. This arrest marked the beginning of a long career in civil disobedience for Billy Frank Jr. Initially - during the 1950s - his motivations to illegal fishing were not as politically driven as other activists like Robert Satiacum who sought out legal cases over illegal fishing. 

"Fish-ins"

The tribal nations in Western Washington reserved the right to fish at all of their usual and accustomed places in common with all citizens of the United States, and to hunt and gather shellfish in treaties with the U.S. government negotiated in the mid-1850s. But when tribal members tried to exercise those rights off-reservation they were arrested for fishing in violation of state law.

By the 1960s the unregulated commercial boats and development of hydroelectric equipment had begun to take their toll on the salmon, and the white sportsmen blamed Native Americans. Frank was a key leader of the "fish-in" protests during the Fish Wars of the 1960's and 1970's. The fish-in demonstrations in the Pacific Northwest, that started in 1963, grew to attract celebrity participation and national media attention before the US Federal Government intervened to sue the state of Washington. Famously the actor Marlon Brando was arrested while participating in one of these demonstrations in 1964. "Fish-ins" were civil rights protests coordinated by the newly formed Survival of the American Indian Society (SAIA), of which Frank was a founding member. The group was assisted by the NAACP and the National Indian Youth Council (NIYC) which was formed in 1961. The protests were modeled in some ways after the black civil rights protests in the south, but were adapted to fit the unique issue at hand. The greatest difference between the goals of the two movements was the rejection of cultural assimilation by the American Indians. The SAIA made efforts to reframe the history of arrest of Native Americans that had taken place in the preceding decades. This reframing campaign was used to lay a ground work of protests over fishing rights as far back as the 1930s. 

In 1963, Frank began a long partnership with Native Rights activist and strategist Hank Adams. Frank was arrested more than 50 times in the Fish Wars of the 1960s and 1970s because of his intense dedication to the treaty fishing rights cause.

The tribal struggle was taken to the courts in U.S. v. Washington, with federal judge George Hugo Boldt issuing a ruling in favor of the native tribes in 1974. The Boldt Decision established the 20 treaty Indian tribes in western Washington as co-managers of the salmon resource with the State of Washington and re-affirmed tribal rights to half of the harvestable salmon returning to western Washington.

What started as a war over numbers morphed into a fight for conservation and habitat protection. Because of the trail blazing achieved by Frank's activism, tribes worked more closely with government officials in a joint effort to conserve natural resources. The foundations established by Frank, in conjunction with the acknowledgement of tribal rights as defined in their treaties with the United States of America, encouraged the development of an inter-government partnership between the two groups.

Northwest Indian Fisheries Commission

The Northwest Indian Fisheries Commission (NWIFC) was created in 1975 to support the natural resource management activities of the 20 treaty Indian tribes in western Washington. The NWIFC is based in Olympia, Washington, with satellite offices in Forks and Mount Vernon.  Frank chaired the NWIFC since for over thirty years, from 1981 until his death on May 5, 2014. The commission's 65-person staff supports member tribes in efforts ranging from fish health to salmon management planning and habitat protection. The NWIFC serves as a forum for tribes to address issues of mutual concern, and as a mechanism for tribes to speak with a unified voice in Washington, D.C.

Titles
Frank has held several different titles his career.

1975–1988 - Fisheries Manager, Nisqually Indian Tribe.
1977, 1981–2014 - Chairman, Northwest Indian Fisheries Commission (NWIFC).
1977–2014 - Commissioner, Medicine Creek Treaty Area in the NWIFC.
1996–2003 - Member of Board of Trustees of The Evergreen State College.
2003–2014 - Founding Board Member, Salmon Defense (a 501(c)3 whose mission is to "protect and defend Pacific Northwest salmon and salmon habitat.")

Honors and awards
Common Cause Award (1985), for his human rights efforts
Washington State Environmental Excellence Award (1987), on behalf of the State Ecological Commission and other tribes.
American Indian Distinguished Service Award (1989)
Martin Luther King Jr. Distinguished Service Award (1990), for humanitarian achievement
Albert Schweitzer Prize for Humanitarianism (1992)
American Indian Visionary Award (2004), from Indian Country Today for "exceptional contributions to Indian American freedom."
Dan Evans Stewardship Award (2006)
Native American Leadership Award (2011), from National Congress of American Indians
 Seattle Aquarium Medal (2011)
 Washington state Medal of Merit (2015)
In November 2015, Frank was posthumously awarded the Presidential Medal of Freedom by President Barack Obama in a ceremony at the White House.
 On April 14, 2021, Washington Governor Jay Inslee signed a law to honor Frank with a statue in the National Statuary Hall Collection, to replace the statue of missionary Marcus Whitman.
 In 2015 the City of Bellingham, Washington changed the name of ‘Indian Street’ near the Western Washington University campus to ‘Billy Frank Jr. Street’.

Further reading 
 Trova Heffernan, Where the Salmon Run: The Life and Legacy of Billy Frank Jr., University of Washington Press, 2013. .

 Charles Wilkinson, Messages from Frank's Landing: A Story of Salmon, Treaties, and the Indian Way, University of Washington Press, 2006. .

References

External links
Historylink.org, Billy Frank Jr.
Institute for Tribal Government, Billy Frank Jr.
Northwest Indian Fisheries Commission

Native American leaders
Native American activists
Nisqually people
People from Thurston County, Washington
Presidential Medal of Freedom recipients
1931 births
2014 deaths
20th-century Native Americans
21st-century Native Americans